William Farley (born 1835, date of death unknown) was a Union Navy sailor in the American Civil War and a recipient of the U.S. military's highest decoration, the Medal of Honor, for his actions during an 1863 engagement.

Biography
Born in 1835 in Whitefield, Maine, Farley joined the Navy from Boston, Massachusetts in December 1860. While on the Stono River on December 25, 1863, Marblehead came under fire from Confederate forces at the Battle of Legareville on Johns Island. Farley "animated his men and kept up a rapid and effective fire on the enemy throughout the engagement". The Confederates eventually abandoned their position, leaving a caisson and gun behind. For this action, he was awarded the Medal of Honor four months later on April 16, 1864.

Medal of Honor citation
Farley's official Medal of Honor citation reads:
Served on board the U.S.S. Marblehead off Legareville, Stono River, 25 December 1863, during an engagement with the enemy on John's Island. Behaving in a gallant manner, Farley animated his men and kept up a rapid and effective fire on the enemy throughout the engagement which resulted in the enemy's abandonment of his positions, leaving a caisson and 1 gun behind.

See also

List of American Civil War Medal of Honor recipients: A–F

References

External links
Boatswain's Mate William Farley, USN, (Born in 1835)
USS Marblehead (I)
America's Heroes: Medal of Honor recipients from the Civil War to Afghanistan

1835 births
Year of death unknown
People from Lincoln County, Maine
People of Maine in the American Civil War
Union Navy sailors
United States Navy Medal of Honor recipients
American Civil War recipients of the Medal of Honor